Rada Trajković (born 8 March 1953) is a Kosovo Serb politician, president of the European Movement of Serbs from Kosovo and Metohija who served as the Minister of Family Services in the Government of Serbia and the second cabinet of Mirko Marjanović from 24 March 1998 to 24 October 2000.

Biography

Early life and career
Rada Trajković was born as Rada Vujačić to a Kosovo Serb family on 8 March 1953, in Podujevo. Her father Mato was a merchant and is of Montenegrin Serb heritage, while her mother Radojka was a housewife. She has a brother Radomir.

She finished elementary school in Podujevo. After high school, she enrolled in mathematics studies, but after marrying Veselin Trajković, she transferred to the Faculty of Medicine at the University of Priština. When she graduated, she got a job at the Oral Clinic at the Clinical Hospital Center in Pristina. After specialization, she became the head of the Laryngology Department. She received her doctorate in early detection of throat cancer.

Political career
The general public learned about Trajković in 1985–86 during the alleged mass poisoning of Kosovo Albanians, when she told the domestic and international public that it was a fraud. She raised media attention for the second time after her conflict with the president of the Serbian Radical Party, Vojislav Šešelj. A member of that party was her husband, and she was a sympathizer of the same for a long time. In the end, she joined the Serbian Radical Party and as its member she was elected a Member of the Federal Assembly of FR Yugoslavia, and in 1998 was named Minister of Family Services in the second cabinet of Mirko Marjanović. After the Kosovo War, on 14 June 1999, Trajković resigned from her position, but continued to perform her duties until 24 October 2000 and she entered the Serbian National Council and served as the Serbian observer in the Provisional Executive Council of Bernard Kouchner.

After the first post-war Kosovan parliamentary elections in 2001, Trajković was elected a member of the Assembly of Kosovo as a representative of the "Return" coalition and served from 2001 to 2004.

She is currently the president of the political organization called the European Movement of Serbs from Kosovo and Metohija and a professor at the Faculty of Medicine at the University of Priština in North Mitrovica.

References

1953 births
Living people
People from Podujevo
Government ministers of Serbia
Serbian Radical Party politicians
Kosovan politicians
Kosovo Serbs
Serbian people of Montenegrin descent
Kosovan people of Montenegrin descent
University of Pristina alumni